Jim Rose may refer to:
 Jim Rose, founder of the Jim Rose Circus
 Jim Rose (journalist) (1909–1999), publisher and founder director of the International Press Institute
 Jim Rose (sports anchor) (born 1953), sports anchor who currently works for WLS-TV
 Jim Rose (basketball) (1949–2009), American basketball player

See also
James Rose (disambiguation)